Rescue Ink Unleashed is a reality television series that premiered on September 25, 2009, on the National Geographic Channel. The series features a Long Island-based animal welfare organization, called Rescue Ink. The group is made up of heavily tattooed motorcycle riders who work to combat animal cruelty and rescue animals in need. The group states they use aggressive and "in-your-face" tactics, to put to shame and report abusive animal owners.  The group takes action to remove distressed animals from their environments,  taking them to no-kill shelters or rehabilitation facilities. They abandoned the Long Beach Animal Shelter leaving the volunteers behind to care for the animals.

The initial cast members went by the names Joe Panz, Big Ant, Johnny O, Eric, G, Angel, Des "the cat man" Junior, Robert, Den Mom Mary and Batso, the 75-year-old eldest member of the group.

References

External links
 Official National Geographic Website
 Official Rescue Ink Website

National Geographic (American TV channel) original programming
Television series about animals
2000s American reality television series
2009 American television series debuts
2009 American television series endings